Julius Matos (born December 12, 1974) is an American former professional baseball second baseman. He played in 76 games for the San Diego Padres during the 2002 San Diego Padres season and 28 games for the Kansas City Royals during the 2003 Kansas City Royals season.

Professional career

Minor leagues
Matos was drafted by the Cleveland Indians in the 1994 Major League Baseball draft in the 16th round.

Major leagues
Matos was signed as a Free Agent with the San Diego Padres on December 6, 2001. He made his Major League debut on May 31, 2002, as a second baseman. On October 15, 2002, he was granted Free Agency. 

Matos was signed by the Kansas City Royals on December 3, 2002.

Coaching career
Matos will join the Double-A Trenton Thunder of the New York Yankees organization as their hitting coach in 2011.

He currently has his own baseball clinic, where he helps children of any age with hitting mechanics, located in New Port Richey, Florida.

References

External links

1974 births
Living people
American expatriate baseball players in Canada
American sportspeople in doping cases
Baseball coaches from New York (state)
Columbus Red Stixx players
Edmonton Trappers players
El Paso Diablos players
High Desert Mavericks players
Indios de Mayagüez players
Kansas City Royals players
Major League Baseball second basemen
Minor league baseball coaches
Mobile BayBears players
Omaha Royals players
Portland Beavers players
San Diego Padres players
Sioux City Explorers players
South Suburban Bulldogs baseball players
Baseball players from New York City
Syracuse SkyChiefs players
Thunder Bay Whiskey Jacks players
Trenton Thunder
Watertown Indians players
Winnipeg Goldeyes players
Baseball players from Wisconsin